Garfield Kart is a kart racing game published by Microids and developed by . The game is based on The Garfield Show, which is based on the American comic strip Garfield. Garfield creator Jim Davis was executive producer. The game was released for Microsoft Windows, Macintosh and Nintendo 3DS, iOS, and Android.

A sequel, Garfield Kart: Furious Racing, was released in 2019. This game and its 2019 sequel were the final appearances of the Garfield Show designs of these characters.

Gameplay 
Garfield Kart is a kart racing game similar to the Mario Kart series. The player can compete on various tracks, collect items, and power-ups which interfere with the other racers. Players can also customize their vehicles and play online, though the online feature is only available on Windows and is currently in beta. The player can choose 8 characters, but only Garfield and Jon are available at first, with the others having to be unlocked. There are daily challenges the player can complete, which will give them options to customize their vehicle.

There are three cups to choose from: Lasagna, Pizza, and Hamburger. There is also the hidden Ice Cream Cup, which is unlocked by completing all the other cups on 150cc difficulty. Each cup contains 4 maps, for 16 in total. There are also three difficulties to choose from: 50cc, 100cc, and 150cc. The Lasagna Cup is always free, and the Pizza Cup is free for 50cc, but for the 100cc and 150cc the player has to unlock the cups, or can pay to try them using in-game coins.

Reception 
Garfield Kart was met with mostly negative reception from critics due to what they called unimaginative gameplay, low production value, and poorly designed mechanics. However, the game was met with very positive reception in user reviews on Steam and other platforms, most likely due to the game becoming an internet meme.

In its review, Nintendo Life gave Garfield Kart a score of 3/10 while describing it as "a bland, horribly un-balanced Kart game". Hardcore Gamer gave Garfield Kart a rating of 1.5, criticizing the game as "absolutely dreadful".

Legacy 
On July 30, 2019, it was reported that Garfield Kart would be getting a sequel titled Garfield Kart: Furious Racing. The game was released on November 7, 2019, for Windows and Macintosh (Steam), and on November 19, 2019, for Nintendo Switch, PlayStation 4, and Xbox One.

References

External links 

2013 video games
Video games based on Garfield
IOS games
Android (operating system) games
Nintendo 3DS games
Windows games
MacOS games
Kart racing video games
Video games based on animated television series
Video games developed in France
Internet memes
Video game memes